T. M. Jacob ( in full T. Mathew Jacob) (16 September 1950 – 30 October 2011) was an Indian politician and the leader of the Kerala Congress (Jacob). Jacob was the Food & Civil Supplies Minister in the UDF government, which was elected into power in Kerala in 2011.

Career

T. M. Jacob was first elected to the Kerala Legislative Assembly as an MLA from Piravom constituency in Ernakulam district in 1977, and remained a member for a period of over thirty years, representing Piravom and Kothamangalam constituencies. Jacob has served as the Education Minister in the Government of Kerala under K. Karunakaran in the 1980s, and as the Irrigation and Water Supply Minister in the UDF Government under A. K. Antony which was elected into power in 2001. He first became a minister in the K. Karunakaran cabinet which held office from 1982–1987  and then subsequently from 1991–1995.

His party Kerala Congress (Jacob) faced a split in 2020 after the sitting Chairman Johnny Nellore and his son Anoop Jacob failed to come into a political agreement.

Personal life

Jacob was born on 16 September 1950, to T S Mathew and Annamma Mathew, as their second son. He was married to Daisy who works as AGM in Federal Bank, Trivandrum. The couple have a son Anoop Jacob and a daughter Ambili. He was admitted to Lakeshore Hospital, Kochion October 17 and died there on 30 October 2011, following liver failure. He had also been under treatment for pulmonary hypertension. He was interred at the Kakkoor St. Mary’s Jacobite church, Piravom. Anoop was elected from Piravom State Assembly Constituency following his father's death, and served as the minister of food & civil supplies in Oommen Chandy ministry. Ambili is working in Technopark Trivandrum.

References

Malayali politicians
Kerala politicians
1950 births
2011 deaths
People from Muvattupuzha
Kerala MLAs 1977–1979
Kerala MLAs 1980–1982
Kerala MLAs 1987–1991
Kerala MLAs 1996–2001
Kerala MLAs 2011–2016
Kerala MLAs 2001–2006
Education Ministers of Kerala
Government Law College, Thiruvananthapuram alumni
Kerala Congress (Jacob) politicians